Kowalik is a Polish surname, a diminutive of Kowal, meaning "smith". Notable people with the surname include:

 Fabian Kowalik (1908–1954), a professional baseball pitcher
 Janusz Kowalik (born 1944), a Polish football player
 Jerzy Kowalik (born 1961), Polish football player and manager
 Jiří Kowalík (born 1977), a Czech footballer
 John Kowalik (1910–1978), an American football player
 Małgorzata Hołub-Kowalik (born 1992), Polish athlete
 Marlena Kowalik (born 1984), a Polish-German football midfielder
 Mirosław Kowalik (born 1969), a Polish motorcycle speedway rider
 Trent Kowalik (born 1995), an American actor, dancer, and singer

See also
 

Polish-language surnames